Elizabeth City (or Elizabeth Cittie as it was then called) was one of four incorporations established in the Virginia Colony in 1619 by the proprietor, the Virginia Company of London, acting in accordance with instructions issued by Sir George Yeardley, Governor.

The plantations and developments were divided into four political divisions, called "incorporations", "burroughs", or "cities".  These were James City, Charles City, Henrico City, and Kiccowtan or Kecoughtan (later Elizabeth City).  Each of the four "citties" (sic) extended across the James River, the main conduit of transportation of the era.

In 1634, under the authority of Charles I of England, Virginia was divided into eight counties, or shires. One of them was Elizabeth City Shire, later Elizabeth City County.  Elizabeth City County existed until 1952, when it was incorporated as the independent city of Hampton, Virginia.

References

Populated places in colonial Virginia
Hampton, Virginia
Populated places established in 1619
1619 establishments in Virginia